Hohhot People's Stadium was a multi-use stadium in Hohhot, Inner Mongolia, China. Situated next to Qingcheng Park, it was used mostly for football matches. This stadium held 30,000 people. Prior to the construction of the new Hohhot City Stadium on the north side of the city, it was the home of the Hohhot City Games, several Inner Mongolia Games, and the site of a wide range of sports and political rally activities. It was also home to the short-lived Hohhot Black Horse, a member of the Chinese Jia League.

Footnotes

Football venues in China
Buildings and structures in Hohhot
Sports venues in Inner Mongolia